Live at the Beacon Theatre is a DVD concert video of James Taylor and his band performing at the Beacon Theatre in New York City on May 30, 1998.

Track listing
 "You Can Close Your Eyes"
 "Another Day"
 "Daddy's All Gone"
 "Everyday"
 "Wasn't That a Mighty Storm"
 "Only a Dream in Rio"
 "Don't Let Me Be Lonely Tonight"
 "Your Smiling Face"
 "Jump Up Behind Me"
 "Shower the People"
 "How Sweet It Is (To Be Loved by You)"
 "Fire and Rain"
 "Me and My Guitar"
 "(I've Got To) Stop Thinkin' 'Bout That"
 "Handy Man"
 "You've Got a Friend"
 "Mexico"
 "A Little More Time With You"
 "Line 'Em Up"
 "Up on the Roof"
 "Ananas"
 "Steamroller Blues"
 "Belfast To Boston"
 "Wandering"
 "Not Fade Away"

Personnel
 James Taylor - Vocals/Guitar/Harmonica 
 Steve Jordan - Drums
 Luis Conte - Percussion
 Clifford Carter - Piano/Keyboards
 Bob Mann - Guitar
 Jimmy Johnson - Bass
 Arnold McCuller - Vocals
 David Lasley - Vocals
 Kate Markowitz - Vocals
 Valerie Carter - Vocals
 Owen Young - Cello
 Barry Danielian - Trumpet
 David Mann - Saxophone

Bonus features
Bonus features include "Copperline" and "Enough to Be on Your Way" music videos.

James Taylor video albums
1998 video albums
1998 live albums
Live video albums
James Taylor live albums